Ronald Harry Coase (29 December 1910 – 2 September 2013) was a British economist and author. Coase received a bachelor of commerce degree (1932) and a PhD from the London School of Economics, where he was a member of the faculty until 1951. He was the Clifton R. Musser Professor of Economics at the University of Chicago Law School, where he arrived in 1964 and remained for the rest of his life. He received the Nobel Memorial Prize in Economic Sciences in 1991.

Coase believed economists should study real-world wealth creation, in the manner of Adam Smith, stating, "It is suicidal for the field to slide into a hard science of choice, ignoring the influences of society, history, culture, and politics on the working of the economy." He believed economic study should reduce emphasis on Price Theory or theoretical markets and instead focus on real markets. He established the case for the corporation as a means to pay the costs of operating a marketplace. Coase is best known for two articles: "The Nature of the Firm" (1937), which introduces the concept of transaction costs to explain the nature and limits of firms; and "The Problem of Social Cost" (1960), which suggests that well-defined property rights could overcome the problems of externalities if it were not for transaction costs (see Coase theorem). Additionally, Coase's transaction costs approach is currently influential in modern organizational economics, where it was reintroduced by Oliver E. Williamson.

Biography

Ronald Harry Coase was born in Willesden, a suburb of London, on 29 December 1910. His father, Henry Joseph Coase (1884–1973) was a telegraphist for the post office, as was his mother, Rosalie Elizabeth Coase (née Giles; 1882–1972), before marriage. As a child, Coase had a weakness in his legs, for which he was required to wear leg-irons. Due to this problem, he attended the school for physical defectives. At the age of 12, he was able to enter Kilburn Grammar School on scholarship. At Kilburn, he studied for the intermediate examination of the University of London as an external student in 1927–29.

Coase then continued his studies at the University of London, enrolling as an internal student of the London School of Economics, where he took courses with Arnold Plant and received a bachelor of commerce degree in 1932. During his undergraduate studies, Coase received the Sir Ernest Cassel Travelling Scholarship which he used to visit the University of Chicago in 1931–1932 studying with Frank Knight and Jacob Viner. Coase's colleagues would later admit that they did not remember this first visit. Between 1932 and 1934, Coase was an assistant lecturer at the Dundee School of Economics and Commerce, which later became part of the University of Dundee. Subsequently, Coase was an assistant lecturer in commerce at the University of Liverpool between 1934 and 1935 before returning to London School of Economics as a member of staff until 1951 in which year he was awarded an earned doctorate in economics from the University of London. He then started to work at the University at Buffalo and retained his British citizenship after moving to the United States in the 1950s. In 1958, he moved to the University of Virginia. Coase settled at the University of Chicago in 1964 and became the co-editor of the Journal of Law and Economics with Aaron Director. He was also for a time a trustee of the Philadelphia Society. He received the Nobel Prize in Economics in 1991.

Nearing his 100th birthday, Coase was working on a book concerning the rise of the economies of China and Vietnam. In an interview, Coase explained the mission of the Coase China Society and his vision of economics and the part to be played by Chinese economists. This became "How China Became Capitalist" (2012) co-authored with Ning Wang. Coase was honoured and received an honorary doctorate from the university at Buffalo Department of Economics in May 2012.

Coase married Marion Ruth Hartung of Chicago, Illinois in Willesden, England, 7 August 1937. Although they were unable to have children, they were married 75 years until her death in 2012, making him one of the longest-married Nobel Prize laureates. Coase himself died in Chicago on 2 September 2013, at the age of 102. His wife had died on 17 October 2012. He was praised across the political spectrum, with Slate calling him "one of the most distinguished economists in the world" and Forbes calling him "the greatest of the many great University of Chicago economists". The Washington Post called his work over eight decades "impossible to summarize" while recommending five of his papers to read.

An important point is that his only student is Steven N. S. Cheung, and both works should be read together. Coase said or wrote once (ref and quote: TBA) that Steven Cheung is the only one who understands his work (for more information, see and translate the French version of this page).

Contributions to economics

"The Nature of the Firm"

In "The Nature of the Firm" (1937), a brief but highly influential essay, Coase attempts to explain why the economy features a number of business firms instead of consisting exclusively of a multitude of independent, self-employed people who contract with one another. Given that "production could be carried on without any organization [that is, firms] at all", Coase asks, why and under what conditions should we expect firms to emerge?

Since modern firms can only emerge when an entrepreneur of some sort begins to hire people, Coase's analysis proceeds by considering the conditions under which it makes sense for an entrepreneur to seek hired help instead of contracting out for some particular task.

The traditional economic theory of the time (in the tradition of Adam Smith) suggested that, because the market is "efficient" (that is, those who are best at providing each good or service most cheaply are already doing so), it should always be cheaper to contract out than to hire.

Coase noted, however, a number of transaction costs involved in using the market; the cost of obtaining a good or service via the market actually exceeds the price of the good. Other costs, including search and information costs, bargaining costs, keeping trade secrets, and policing and enforcement costs, can all potentially add to the cost of procuring something from another party. This suggests that firms will arise which can internalise the production of goods and services required to deliver a product, thus avoiding these costs. This argument sets the stage for the later contributions by Oliver Williamson: markets and hierarchies are alternative co-ordination mechanisms for economic transactions.

There is a natural limit to what a firm can produce internally, however. Coase notices "decreasing returns to the entrepreneur function", including increasing overhead costs and increasing propensity for an overwhelmed manager to make mistakes in resource allocation. These factors become countervailing costs to the use of the firm.

Coase argues that the size of a firm (as measured by how many contractual relations are "internal" to the firm and how many "external") is a result of finding an optimal balance between the competing tendencies of the costs outlined above. In general, making the firm larger will initially be advantageous, but the decreasing returns indicated above will eventually kick in, preventing the firm from growing indefinitely.

Other things being equal, therefore, a firm will tend to be larger:
 the lower the costs of organising and the slower these costs rise with an increase in the number of transactions organised
 the less likely the entrepreneur is to make mistakes and the smaller the increase in mistakes with an increase in the transactions organised
 the greater the lowering (or the smaller the rise) in the supply price of factors of production to firms of larger size

The first two costs will increase with the spatial distribution of the transactions organised and the dissimilarity of the transactions. This explains why firms tend to either be in different geographic locations or to perform different functions. Additionally, technology changes that mitigate the cost of organising transactions across space may allow firms to become larger – the advent of the telephone and of cheap air travel, for example, would be expected to increase the size of firms.

A further exploration of the dichotomy between markets and hierarchies as co-ordination mechanisms for economic transactions derived a third alternative way called Commons based peer production, in which individuals successfully collaborate on large-scale projects following a diverse cluster of motivational drives and social signals.

"The Problem of Social Cost"

Upon publishing his article The Federal Communications Commission in 1959, Coase received negative feedback from the faculty at the University of Chicago over his conclusions and apparent conflicts with A. C. Pigou. According to Coase, "What I said was thought to run counter to Pigou's analysis by a number of economists at the University of Chicago and was therefore, according to them, wrong.  At a meeting in Chicago I was able to convince these economists that I was right and Pigou's analysis faulty." Coase had presented his paper in 1960 during a seminar in Chicago, to twenty senior economist including George Stigler and Milton Friedman. He gradually won over the usually skeptic audience, in what has later been considered a "paradigm-shifting moment" in the genesis of Chicago Law and Economics. Coase would join the Chicago faculty four years later.

Published in the Journal of Law and Economics in 1960, while Coase was a member of the Economics department at the University of Virginia, "The Problem of Social Cost" provided the key insight that it is unclear where the blame for externalities lies. The example he gave was of a rancher whose cattle stray onto the cropland of his neighbour. If the rancher is made to restrict his cattle, he is harmed just as the farmer is if the cattle remain unrestrained.

Coase argued that without transaction costs the initial assignment of property rights makes no difference to whether or not the farmer and rancher can achieve the economically efficient outcome. If the cost of restraining cattle by, say, building a fence, is less than the cost of crop damage, the fence will be built. The initial assignment of property rights determines who builds the fence. If the farmer is responsible for the crop damage, the farmer will pay for the fence (as long the fence costs less than the crop damage). The allocation of property rights is primarily an equity issue, with consequences for the distribution of income and wealth, rather than an efficiency issue.

With sufficient transaction costs, initial property rights matter for both equity and efficiency. From the point of view of economic efficiency, property rights should be assigned such that the owner of the rights wants to take the economically efficient action. To elaborate, if it is efficient not to restrict the cattle, the rancher should be given the rights (so that cattle can move about freely), whereas if it is efficient to restrict the cattle, the farmer should be given the rights over the movement of the cattle (so the cattle are restricted).

This seminal argument forms the basis of the famous Coase theorem as labelled by Stigler.

Law and economics

Though trained as an economist, Coase spent much of his career working in a law school. He is a central figure in the development of the subfield of law and economics. He viewed law and economics as having two parts, the first "using the economists' approach and concepts to analyze the working of the legal system, often called the economic analysis of the law"; and the second "a study of the influence of the legal system on the working of the economic system." Coase said that the second part "is the part of law and economics in which I am most interested."

In his Simons Lecture celebrating the centennial of the University of Chicago, titled "Law and Economics at Chicago", Coase noted that he only accidentally wandered into the field:

Despite wandering accidentally into law and economics, the opportunity to edit the Journal of Law and Economics was instrumental in bringing him to the University of Chicago:

Coase believed that the University of Chicago was the intellectual center of law and economics. He concluded his Simons lecture by stating:

I am very much aware that, in concentrating in this lecture on law and economics at Chicago, I have neglected other significant contributions to the subject made elsewhere such as those by Guido Calabresi at Yale, by Donald Turner at Harvard, and by others. But it can hardly be denied that in the emergence of the subject of law and economics, Chicago has played a very significant part and one of which the University can be proud.

Coase theorem
In law and economics, the Coase theorem describes the economic efficiency of an economic allocation or outcome in the presence of externalities. The theorem states that if trade in an externality is possible and there are sufficiently low transaction costs, bargaining will lead to a Pareto efficient outcome regardless of the initial allocation of property. In practice, obstacles to bargaining or poorly defined property rights can prevent Coasean bargaining. This 'theorem' is commonly attributed to Coase.

Coase conjecture
Another important contribution of Coase is the Coase conjecture, which states that an informal argument that durable-goods monopolists do not have market power because they are unable to commit to not lowering their prices in future periods.

Political views
When asked what he considered his politics to be, Coase stated,

I really don't know. I don't reject any policy without considering what its results are. If someone says there's going to be regulation, I don't say that regulation will be bad. Let's see. What we discover is that most regulation does produce, or has produced in recent times, a worse result. But I wouldn't like to say that all regulation would have this effect because one can think of circumstances in which it doesn't.

Coase admitted that early in life, he aligned himself with socialism.

Guido Calabresi wrote that Coase's focus on transaction costs in The Nature of the Firm was the result of his socialist beliefs. Reflecting on this, Coase wrote: "It is very difficult to know where one's ideas come from but for all I know he may well be right." Coase continued:

Ronald Coase Institute
Coase was research advisor to the Ronald Coase Institute, an organisation that promotes research on institutions and organizations – the laws, rules, customs, and norms – that govern real economic systems, with particular support for young scholars from developing and transitional countries.

Coase-Sandor Institute for Law and Economics

The University of Chicago Law School carries on the legacy of Ronald Coase through the mission of the Coase-Sandor Institute for Law and Economics.  Each year, the University of Chicago Law School hosts the Coase Lecture, which was delivered in 2003 by Ronald Coase himself.

Publications
 
 
 
 
  (Nobel Prize lecture)
 Coase, R. H. (1994) Essays on Economics and Economists. The University of Chicago Press. .
 
 
 
 How China Became Capitalist (2012) co-authored with Ning Wang. Palgrave Macmillan. .

See also

 Government failure
 Horizontal integration
 List of think tanks
 Vertical integration

References

Bibliography

External links

 A video of Prof. Coase talking about law and economics
 
 
 Wireless Communications and Computing at a Crossroads, Journal on Telecommunications & High Technology Law, Vol. 3, No. 2. pp. 205, 239
 Coase Institute
 "Looking for Results", interview in Reason by Thomas W. Hazlett
 2003 Coase Centennial Speech delivered by Coase (500MB QuickTime video file)
 "Why do Firms Exist?", Schumpeter, The Economist, 2010.
 Russ Roberts's "Coase on Externalities, the Firm, and the State of Economics" from the Library of Economics and Liberty
 No Cheap Victories – Last Interview and Tribute
 Ronald Coase and the Misuse of Economics by John Cassidy, The New Yorker, 2013
 
 
 
 Guide to the Ronald H. Coase Papers 1805–2013 at the University of Chicago Special Collections Research Center

1910 births
2013 deaths
Alumni of University of London Worldwide
Alumni of the University of London
Alumni of the London School of Economics
English business theorists
British economics writers
Law and economics scholars
Historians of economic thought
Nobel laureates in Economics
People educated at Kilburn Grammar School
People from Willesden
Public choice theory
University at Buffalo faculty
University of Chicago faculty
University of Virginia faculty
English centenarians
Men centenarians
University of Virginia alumni
English Nobel laureates
20th-century English historians
20th-century English male writers
21st-century English historians
20th-century  British economists
21st-century  British economists
New institutional economists
Environmental economists
Cato Institute people
Academics of the University of Dundee
Earhart Foundation Fellows
Distinguished Fellows of the American Economic Association
Academics of the London School of Economics
Corresponding Fellows of the British Academy
Chicago School economists
Member of the Mont Pelerin Society